Phillip Alleyne is a former West Indian cricket umpire. He stood in one ODI game in 1978.

See also
 List of One Day International cricket umpires
 Australian cricket team in West Indies in 1977–78

References

Year of birth missing (living people)
Living people
West Indian One Day International cricket umpires
Place of birth missing (living people)